Albino Trevisan (3 March 1931 – 3 April 2020) was an Italian rower. He competed at the 1952 Summer Olympics in Helsinki with the men's coxed four where they were eliminated in the semi-final repêchage.

References

External links 
 

1931 births
2020 deaths
Italian male rowers
Olympic rowers of Italy
Rowers at the 1952 Summer Olympics
European Rowing Championships medalists
Sportspeople from Venice